Class E el (Cyrillic script: Ээл) was a Soviet diesel-electric locomotive class built between 1931 and 1941. There were three sub-classes but all were very similar. E el-5 was a prototype built in Germany in 1931. E el-9 was a prototype built in the Russian SFSR in 1932. E el-12 was also built in the RSFSR and went into series production. It had the highly unusual 2-Eo-1 wheel arrangement.

Engine
The prime mover was a six-cylinder four stroke diesel engine.  The E el-5 had a German built MAN engine giving  at 450 rpm. The E el 12 had a Soviet built engine, based on the German design, giving   at 425 rpm. It is uncertain which engine was used in the E el-9.

Electrical equipment
There were five 140 kW Brown Boveri traction motors, connected in parallel. Innovations in the E el-5 included forced ventilation for the traction motors, field weakening for high speed running and rheostatic braking. The rheostatic braking was excluded from the Soviet built locomotives, to save weight, but they still weighed several tons more than the E el-5.

Disposal
None of the class is known to have been preserved.

References

Railway locomotives introduced in 1931
E el
5 ft gauge locomotives